Turnover or turn over may refer to:

Arts, entertainment, and media
Turn Over, a 1988 live album by Japanese band Show-Ya
Turnover (band), an American rock band
"Turnover", a song on Fugazi's 1990 album Repeater
Turnover, a Japanese manga and animated short animated by Studio 4°C
 "Turnover" (Hit the Floor), an episode of Hit the Floor
"Turn Over", a 2021 EP Album by South Korean boy band SF9

Business
Turnover (employment), relative rate at which an employer gains and loses staff
Asset turnover or asset turns, a financial ratio that measures the efficiency of a company's use of its assets in generating sales revenue
Customer attrition, the rate at which a business loses customers, sometimes called the churn
Inventory turnover or inventory turns, a measure of the number of times inventory is sold or used in a time period
Sales turnover or revenue, income a business has from sales
Turnover tax, an indirect tax similar to a sales tax or a VAT

Science
Cell turnover, the replacement of old cells with newly generated ones
Lake turnover, when the waters in a lake ecosystem begin to mix again to create a uniform temperature
Population turnover, measure of gross moves in relation to the size of a population
Substance turnover, or biogeochemical cycle, a pathway by which a chemical substance moves
Turnover number, a measure related to chemical conversions
 Turnover time,  flushing time, the ratio of mass to flux

Sports
Turnover (basketball), when a player loses possession of the ball resulting from a steal, going out of bounds, committing a violation, or committing an offensive foul
Turnover (gridiron football), in American and Canadian football when the offense loses possession of the football because of a fumble, interception, or on downs
Turnover (rugby league), when a team loses possession or at the end of a team's six tackles
Turnover (rugby union), when a team loses possession in a ruck or a maul

Other uses
 Turnover (food), a type of pastry made by placing a filling on a piece of dough, folding the dough over, and sealing it
 Turnover bridge, a type of bridge
 Turnover pistol, a type of gun

See also
Over (disambiguation)
Overturn
TO (disambiguation)
Turn (disambiguation)

cs:Obrat
sk:Obrat